Khineh (also Romanized as Khīneh) is a village in Padena-ye Vosta Rural District, Padena District, Semirom County, Isfahan Province, Iran. At the 2006 census, its population was 259, in 76 families.

References 

Populated places in Semirom County